Football teams in Bath may refer to one of the following association football clubs:
 
 Bath City (Tier 6)
 Larkhall Athletic (Tier 8)
 Odd Down (Tier 10)